Robinson Ekspeditionen: 2001, was the fourth season of the Danish version of the Swedish show Expedition Robinson and it premiered on 10 September 2001 and aired until 3 December 2001. A new thing in the show was the Talisman could now be traded for an extra vote, instead of being used for immunity. The first part of the season saw the South team's domination of challenges which led to the first ever tribal swap in the Danish version of the show. When it came time for a merge, three jokers were added to the game. Due to two exits by Ramin Zomorodnia and Lars "Mars" Johansen, Johnny Holm was allowed to return to the game shortly after his initial elimination. Ultimately, it was Marlene Hasselblad from the minority North team who won the season with a jury vote of 10-5 over Lars Lang. The initial vote was 7-2, but with the male and female audience votes being taken into effect (each had three votes to cast) six more votes were split among the finalists.

Finishing order

External links
http://www.bt.dk/nyheder/her-er-deltagerne-i-robinson-2001

Robinson Ekspeditionen seasons